Francisco Clavet was the defending champion but lost in the quarterfinals to Karim Alami.

Alami won the final 7–5, 2–1 after Adrian Voinea was forced to retire.

Seeds
A champion seed is indicated in bold text while text in italics indicates the round in which that seed was eliminated.

  Félix Mantilla (second round)
  Alberto Berasategui (second round)
  Carlos Moyá (second round)
  Àlex Corretja (quarterfinals)
  Francisco Clavet (quarterfinals)
  Javier Sánchez (first round)
  Hernán Gumy (second round)
  Jordi Burillo (quarterfinals)

Draw

References
 1996 Campionati Internazionali di Sicilia Draw

Campionati Internazionali di Sicilia
1996 ATP Tour
Camp